Austrophasiopsis is a genus of flies in the family Tachinidae.

Species
Austrophasiopsis formosensis Townsend, 1933
Austrophasiopsis luteipennis Mesnil, 1953

References

Tachinidae
Taxa named by Charles Henry Tyler Townsend
Diptera of Asia